Lorenzo Scattorin (born 22 September 1971) is an Italian voice actor who contributes to voicing characters in movies, cartoons, anime and other content.

He is well known for providing the voice of the character Sanji in the Italian language version of the long-running anime series One Piece. Scattorin also voiced Seto Kaiba in the Italian-language version of Yu-Gi-Oh! Duel Monsters.

He provided the voice of the character Hanzo in the video game Overwatch.

He is also the son of the actor Maurizio Scattorin. He works at Merak Film, Studio Asci, Studio P.V. and other dubbing studios in Italy.

Voice work

Animation and anime 
 Abel in Fire Emblem Anime
 Sanji, Koshiro (1st voice) and Inuppe, in One Piece
 Sanji in Clockwork Island Adventure
 Sanji in Chopper's Kingdom on the Island of Strange Animals
 Sanji in One Piece The Movie: Dead End no Bōken
 Sanji in One Piece: Norowareta Seiken
 Sanji in Baron Omatsuri and the Secret Island
 Sanji in Giant Mecha Soldier of Karakuri Castle
 Seto Kaiba in Yu-Gi-Oh! Duel Monsters
 Seto Kaiba in Yu-Gi-Oh! The Movie: Pyramid of Light
 Daichi Misawa in Yu-Gi-Oh! Duel Monsters GX
 Jin Himuro in Yu-Gi-Oh! 5D's
 Iruka Umino in Naruto
 Iruka Umino in Naruto: Shippuden
 Mizore Fuyukuma in Naruto The Movie: Ninja Clash in the Land of Snow
 Andrew "Bummer" Baumer in Stoked
 Zim in Invader Zim
 Dororo in Keroro Gunso
 Lujon (Episode 35) in Fullmetal Alchemist
 Prince Adam/He-Man in He-Man and the Masters of the Universe
 Haruki Hanai in School Rumble
 Gilliam in Blue Dragon
 Bulkhead in Transformers Animated
 Pete Costas in Max Steel
 Gordon, Norman in Pokémon
 Mr. Blik in Catscratch
 Tom Thomas in Fireman Sam (2004 series)
 Scott Summers/Cyclops in Wolverine and the X-Men
 Icarus in Saint Seiya Heaven Chapter: Overture
 Rockin' Robin in Sugar Sugar Rune
 Sulphur in Jewelpet
 Gaito in Mermaid Melody Pichi Pichi Pitch
 Hayato Shingu in Project ARMS'
 Thénardier in Les Misérables: Shōjo Cosette Belphegor in Belphegor Keiichiro Akasaka in Tokyo Mew Mew Aion in Chrono Crusade Magna in Spider Riders Tora in Dragon Ball Z: Bardock – The Father of Goku Misao Yamamura (3rd voice), Shuichi Akai (1st voice), and Gin (2nd voice) in Detective Conan Asato Kido in YuYu Hakusho Ganryu in Bleach: Memories of Nobody Jean Descole in Professor Layton and the Eternal Diva Kenshiro in Legend of Raoh: Chapter of Death in Love Kenshiro in Legend of Yuria Kenshiro in Legend of Raoh: Chapter of Fierce Fight Kenshiro inLegend of Toki Kenshiro in Zero: Legend of Kenshiro Jubei Kibagami in Ninja Scroll: The Series Masahira in Vampire Hunter D: Bloodlust Akito Tenkawa in Martian Successor Nadesico: The Motion Picture – Prince of Darkness Pepe in Nasu: Summer in Andalusia Ollie in T.U.F.F. Puppy Galk in Claymore Alucard in Hellsing Ultimate Jeredy Suno in Monsuno Rockin' Robin in Sugar Sugar Rune Prince Blueblood in My Little Pony: Friendship Is Magic Live action films and shows 
 Shaun in Shaun of the Dead Alan Erasmus in 24 Hour Party People Sean Linden in Slap Shot 2: Breaking the Ice Andy Kasper in The First $20 Million Is Always the Hardest Sean McNamara in Nip/Tuck Det. Jack Hale in Killer Instinct (TV series) Jonas Rey in Strong Medicine Giuseppe Garibaldi in A Casa das Sete Mulheres Detective Park Doo-man in Memories of Murder Bobby in Joy Ride 2: Dead Ahead Steve Addington in Surfer, Dude Rufus Zeno in House of Anubis Adrian in The Hidden Face Video games 
 Tom Hagen in The Godfather: The Game Tom Hagen in The Godfather II Joel in The Last of Us, The Last of Us Part II
 Vector in Resident Evil: Operation Raccoon City General Wilhelm “Deathshead” Strasse in Wolfenstein (2009 video game) Sherlock Holmes in Sherlock Holmes: The Awakened Sherlock Holmes in Sherlock Holmes Versus Arsène Lupin James "Sawyer" Ford in Lost: Via Domus Hunter in The Legend of Spyro: Dawn of the Dragon Liu Kang and Superman in Mortal Kombat vs. DC Universe Murgo in Fable II Father Gascoigne in Bloodborne Vito Scaletta in Mafia II Edward Carnby in Alone in the Dark (2008 video game) Kyle Crane in Dying Light TV specials 
David Copperfield in David Copperfield – L'uomo impossibile (Italian edition of the special The Magic of David Copperfield XVII: The Tornado of Fire'')

References

External links 
 

Living people
Male actors from Milan
Italian male voice actors
1971 births